16-Ketoestrone (16-keto-E1, or 16-oxoestrone, or 16-oxo-E1) is an endogenous estrogen related to 16α-hydroxyestrone and 16β-hydroxyestrone. In contrast to 16α-hydroxyestrone and 16β-hydroxyestrone, but similarly to 16-ketoestradiol, 16-ketoestrone is a very weak estrogen with less than 1/1000 the estrogenic potency of estrone in the uterus. 16-Ketoestrone has been reported to act as an inhibitor of 17β-hydroxysteroid dehydrogenases. 16-Ketoestrone can be converted by 16α-hydroxysteroid dehydrogenase into estriol in the body.

References

Alcohols
Estranes
Estrogens
Human metabolites
Phenols